Baron Gardner, of Uttoxeter, is a dormant title in the Peerage of Ireland. It was created in 1800 for Sir Alan Gardner, an Admiral of the Blue and former Member of Parliament for Plymouth and Westminster. In 1806, he was also created Baron Gardner, of Uttoxeter in the County of Stafford, in the Peerage of the United Kingdom. His son, the second Baron, was also an Admiral in the Royal Navy. In 1815, it was announced that he was to be created a viscount, but Lord Gardner died before the patent had passed the Great Seal.

He was succeeded by his son, the third Baron. He was a Whig politician and served as a Lord-in-waiting (government whip in the House of Lords) from 1837 to 1841. On his death in 1883 the peerages became dormant. They were claimed by Alan Gardner, grandson of the second son of the first Baron, who styled himself "Lord Gardner", but neither he nor any other male-line descendant have been able to prove their claim to the titles satisfactorily. It has been suggested by William Dalrymple that the current heir to the barony is from Gardner family of Khasgunge (now Kasganj), Uttar Pradesh, India.

Another member of the Gardner family was the Liberal politician Herbert Gardner, 1st Baron Burghclere. He was the illegitimate son of the third Baron Gardner.

Barons Gardner (1800; 1806)
Alan Gardner, 1st Baron Gardner (1742–1809)
Alan Hyde Gardner, 2nd Baron Gardner (1771–1815)
Alan Legge Gardner, 3rd Baron Gardner (1810–1883)

See also
Baron Burghclere

Notes

References

Kidd, Charles, Williamson, David (editors). Debrett's Peerage and Baronetage (1990 edition). New York: St Martin's Press, 1990.

Dormant baronies in the Peerage of Ireland
Extinct baronies in the Peerage of the United Kingdom
Noble titles created in 1800
Noble titles created in 1806
Noble titles created for UK MPs